Maya Buzinova (23 July 1929 – 30 January 2022) was a Russian animator.

She was born on 23 July 1929 in Orel, but soon the family moved to Mtsensk. Having lost her father at the very beginning of World War II (died under a locomotive), the family until August 1943 had to live in the territory occupied by the Germans. Maya went to school in the village of Pakhomovo, near Orel.

From 1947 to 1954, she studied in Moscow at the painting department of the M. I. Kalinin Art and Industrial School. At the end, she was engaged in the design of exhibitions, and then, on the advice of friends, she came to Soyuzmultfilm, where the artist Vladimir Pekar was gaining courses in phasers. As a result, since 1956, she worked at a film studio, first on cartoon ones, and a couple of years later, at the invitation of the director of the puppet association, Joseph Boyarsky, she switched to puppet animation - on Spasopeskovsky lane, 4a.

In 1977, striving for their own vision of a puppet film, together with their husband Joseph Douksha , they moved to the Multtelefilm studio in TO Ekran, where in 1978 they made their debut as directors of the cartoon Postman's Tale . Until 1992, they continued to work on puppet animation in co-authorship.

Buzinova died on 30 January 2022, at the age of 92.

References

External links
 

1929 births
2022 deaths

Soviet animators
Russian animators
Russian women animators
Soviet animation directors
People from Oryol